Yuval Shalom Freilich (יובל פרייליך; born 24 January 1995) is an Israeli left-handed épée fencer.

Biography

Yuval Freilich was born in Israel, and grew up in a religiously observant Jewish home in Gush Etzion in the settlement of Neve Daniel, and in Havatzelet HaSharon. His parents Gabby (a radiologist) and Rachel Freilich had emigrated to Israel from Sydney, Australia, and he has five siblings. He is the nephew of former Organisation of Rabbis of Australasia president Rabbi Dovid Freilich.

In 2000, when Freilich was a child, his family moved to Australia, where he lived for five years and attended Moriah College primary school, but then returned to Israel in 2004. He served as a soldier in the Israel Defense Forces, and trained at Wingate Institute. He later attended Open University of Israel in Netanya, Israel, and IDC Herzliya, where he double majored in Law and Government.

Fencing career

Freilich began fencing at the age of five.  His coach is Ohad Balva, and his club is Hapoel Kfar-Saba

In 2011 he won the European Cadet Championship. In 2012 at 17 years of age Freilich won the men's épée World Cadet and Junior Fencing Championship in Moscow, and became the #1-ranked épée cadet in the world.

In March 2014 Freilich won the European Men's Épée Junior Championships. In April 2014 Freilich came in 6th at the World Men's Épée Junior Championships.

In March 2015 Freilich again won the European Men's Épée Junior Championships. In 2015 he was the #1 ranked junior épée fencer in the world. In February 2016 he won a Men's Épée bronze medal at the Peter Bakonyi World Cup in Vancouver, Canada.

On June 18, 2019, Freilich won Israel's first European fencing title in the men's individual épée tournament at the 2019 European Fencing Championships in Düsseldorf, Germany. Israel's first European medal had been won by Noam Mills, who won a women's individual épée bronze medal in Leipzig, Germany, in 2010.

On June 22, 2022, he won the épée team silver medal with Israel at the 2022 European Fencing Championships in Antalya, Turkey.

Medal record

European Championship

World Cup

See also 
List of select Jewish fencers
Sports in Israel

References

External links 
 

Israeli male épée fencers
Living people
1995 births
Jewish male épée fencers
Israeli people of Australian-Jewish descent
Moshavniks
Wingate Institute alumni
Open University of Israel alumni
Reichman University alumni
Israeli settlers